The Pavlograd uezd was one of the subdivisions of the Yekaterinoslav Governorate of the Russian Empire. It was situated in the northern part of the governorate. Its administrative centre was Pavlograd (Pavlohrad).

Demographics
At the time of the Russian Empire Census of 1897, Pavlogradsky Uyezd had a population of 251,460. Of these, 79.7% spoke Ukrainian, 14.4% Russian, 2.9% Yiddish, 2.3% German, 0.2% Polish, 0.2% Belarusian, 0.1% Tatar and 0.1% Romani as their native language.

References

 
Uyezds of Yekaterinoslav Governorate
Yekaterinoslav Governorate